The 1996 Blaxland by-election was held in the Australian electorate of Blaxland in New South Wales on 15 June 1996. The by-election was triggered by the resignation of the sitting member, the Australian Labor Party's Paul Keating on 23 April 1996. The writ for the by-election was issued on 13 May 1996.

Background
Blaxland had been held since 1969 by Paul Keating, who had been Treasurer under Bob Hawke from 1983, until he defeated Hawke in a leadership challenge in December 1991, becoming Prime Minister of Australia. Keating went on to defeat John Hewson at the 1993 election, but three years later the ALP was defeated in a landslide victory by a resurgent Coalition led by John Howard at the 1996 election on 2 March. Following the party's election loss, Keating immediately resigned as party leader, and several weeks later, resigned from the Parliament.

Results

Aftermath
The Australian Labor Party retained the seat with an increased majority, with Michael Hatton as their candidate. The Liberal Party of Australia declined to run a candidate, and this saw a rise in the vote for two minor anti-immigration parties: Australians Against Further Immigration and Reclaim Australia: Reduce Immigration, which came second and third in the popular vote. On a two-party preferred basis, RARI gained their best ever result in an election, gaining over 30% of the vote on preferences.

See also
 List of Australian federal by-elections

References

External links
Blaxland (NSW) By-Election (15 June 1996), Australian Electoral Commission

1996 elections in Australia
New South Wales federal by-elections